Poshtir (also Romanized as Poshtīr; also known as Poshtīr-e Bālā) is a village in Taher Gurab Rural District, in the Central District of Sowme'eh Sara County, Gilan Province, Iran. At the 2006 census, its population was 338, in 104 families.

References 

Populated places in Sowme'eh Sara County